COUPERIN (Consortium unifié des établissements universitaires et de recherche pour l'accès aux publications numériques) (English: Unified Consortium of Higher Education and Research Organizations for Access to Digital Publications) is an academic consortium in France. Formed in 1999, it includes more than 250 universities, research organizations, Grandes écoles (schools), COMUE, and others. The consortium negotiates with publishers the prices and conditions of access to scientific publications and other digital resources for the benefit of its members. It promotes open science, particularly with regard to scientific publications, both nationally and internationally. It is headquartered in Paris.

Members
As of 2018, members of the Couperin consortium include the following institutions.

Universities 
 Bordeaux INP
 
 COMUE - Lille Nord de France
 COMUE - Normandie Université
 COMUE - Paris Sciences et Lettres
 COMUE - Sorbonne Universités
 COMUE - Université Bretagne Loire
 COMUE - Université confédérale Léonard de Vinci
 COMUE - Université de Lyon
 COMUE - Université fédérale de Toulouse Midi-Pyrénées
 COMUE - Université Paris Saclay
 COMUE - Université Paris Seine
 Conservatoire national des arts et métiers
 Ecole des hautes études en sciences sociales
 École française d'Athènes
 École française de Rome
 École pratique des hautes études
 Fondation Maison des sciences de l'Homme
 Institut Catholique d'Etudes Supérieures
 Institut Catholique de Paris
 Institut d'Etudes Politiques de Bordeaux (Sciences Po Bordeaux)
 Institut d'Etudes Politiques de Grenoble (Sciences Po Grenoble)
 Institut d'Etudes Politiques de Lyon (Sciences Po Lyon)
 Institut d'Etudes Politiques de Paris (Sciences Po Paris)
 Institut National d'Histoire de l'Art
 Institut national polytechnique de Toulouse
 Institut national supérieur de formation et de recherche pour l'éducation des jeunes handicapés et les enseignements adaptés (Inshea)
 Institut national universitaire Champollion
 Institut supérieur de mécanique de Paris (SupMeca)
 Muséum National d'Histoire Naturelle
 Observatoire de Paris-Meudon
 Pôle universitaire Léonard-de-Vinci
 Université catholique de l'Ouest
 Université catholique de Lyon
 Université Claude Bernard (Lyon I)
 Université Clermont-Auvergne
 Université d'Aix-Marseille
 Université d'Angers
 Université d'Artois
 Université d'Avignon et des Pays de Vaucluse
 Université d'Evry-Val-d'Essonne
 Université d'Orléans
 Université de Bordeaux
 Université de Bourgogne
 Université de Bretagne occidentale
 Université de Bretagne-Sud
 Université de Caen Basse-Normandie
 Université de Cergy-Pontoise
 Université de Corse Pasquale Paoli
 Université de Franche-Comté
 Université de Haute-Alsace
 Université de la Guyane
 Université de la Nouvelle-Calédonie
 Université de la Polynésie Française - Tahiti
 Université de La Réunion
 Université de La Rochelle
 Université de Lille I Sciences et technologies
 Université de Lille II Droit et Santé
 Université de Lille III Sciences humaines et sociales
 Université de Limoges
 Université de Lorraine
 Université de Montpellier
 Université de Nantes
 Université de Nice Sophia Antipolis
 Université de Nimes
 Université de Paris Ouest Nanterre La Défense (Paris X)
 Université de Pau et des Pays de l'Adour
 Université de Perpignan Via Domitia
 Université de Picardie Jules Verne
 Université de Poitiers
 Université de Reims Champagne-Ardenne
 Université de Rennes I
 Université de Rennes II Haute-Bretagne
 Université de Rouen
 Université de Savoie
 Université de Strasbourg
 Université de technologie de Belfort-Montbéliard
 Université de technologie de Compiègne
 Université de technologie de Troyes
 Université de Toulon
 Université de Toulouse I Capitole
 Université de Toulouse Jean Jaurès (Toulouse II le Mirail)
 Université de Valenciennes et du Hainaut-Cambrésis
 Université de Versailles St Quentin en Yvelines
 
 Université du Havre
 Université du Littoral Côte d'Opale
 Université du Maine
 Université François Rabelais (Tours)
 Université Grenoble Alpes
 Université Jean Monnet Saint-Etienne
 Université Jean Moulin (Lyon III)
 Université Louis Lumière (Lyon II)
 Université Michel de Montaigne (Bordeaux III)
 Université Panthéon-Assas (Paris II)
 Université Panthéon-Sorbonne (Paris I)
 Université Paris Descartes (Paris V)
 Université Paris Diderot (Paris VII)
 Université Paris Est Marne-la-Vallée
 Université Paris XIII Paris Nord
 Université Paris-Sorbonne (Paris IV)
 Université Paul Sabatier (Toulouse III)
 Université Paul Valéry (Montpellier III)
 Université Pierre et Marie Curie (Paris VI)
 Université Sorbonne Nouvelle (Paris III)
 Université Vincennes-Saint Denis (Paris VIII)

Research organizations 
 Agence Nationale de Sécurité des Médicaments et des produits de santé
 Agence nationale de sécurité sanitaire de l'alimentation, de l'environnement et du travail
 Bureau de recherches géologiques et minières
 Centre de coopération internationale en recherche agronomique pour le développement
 Centre national d'études spatiales
 Centre national de la recherche scientifique
 Commissariat à l'énergie atomique
 Eurecom
 IFP Energies nouvelles
 Institut de Physique du Globe de Paris
 Institut de Radioprotection et de Sûreté Nucléaire
 Institut de Recherche en Sciences et Technologies pour l'Environnement et l'Agriculture
 Institut de Recherche et de Documentation en Economie de la Santé
 Institut de recherche et de sécurité pour la prévention des accidents du travail et des maladies professionnelles
 Institut de Recherche pour le Développement
 Institut de Recherches Economiques et Sociales
 Institut Français de Recherche pour l'Exploitation de la Mer
 Institut Français des Sciences et Technologies des Transports, de l'aménagement et des Réseaux
 Institut National de l'Environnement Industriel et des Risques
 Institut national de l'information géographique et forestière
 Institut National de la Recherche Agronomique
 Institut National de la Santé et de la Recherche Médicale
 Institut National de Recherche en Informatique et en Automatique
 Institut Pasteur
 Joint ILL-ESRF Library (Institut Max von Laue-Paul Langevin)
 Laboratoire National de l'Eau et des Milieux Aquatiques
 Laboratoire National de Métrologie et d'Essais
 Office National d'Etudes et de Recherches Aérospatiales - The French Aerospace Lab
 Organisation de Coopération et de Développement Economiques

Grandes écoles 
 Agrocampus Ouest
 AgroParisTech
 Agrosup Dijon
 Arts et Métiers ParisTech
 Audencia Business School
 Bordeaux Sciences Agro (ex Enita Bordeaux)
 Centrale Supelec
 Chimie ParisTech (ex Ecole Nationale Supérieure de Chimie de Paris)
 Ecole centrale de Lille
 Ecole centrale de Lyon
 Ecole centrale de Marseille
 Ecole centrale de Nantes
 Ecole d'Ingénieurs en génie des systèmes industriels
 Ecole de biologie industrielle
 Ecole de management de Normandie
 Ecole des Hautes Etudes Commerciales de Paris
 Ecole des hautes études de santé publique
 Ecole des Mines d'Albi-Carnaux
 Ecole des Mines d'Alès
 Ecole des Mines de Douai
 Ecole des Mines de Saint-Etienne
 Ecole nationale d'ingénieurs de Saint-Etienne
 Ecole nationale de formation agronomique
 Ecole nationale de l'aviation civile
 Ecole nationale des Chartes
 Ecole nationale des Ponts et Chaussées (Ponts ParisTech)
 Ecole nationale des Travaux publics de l'Etat
 Ecole nationale du Génie de l'Eau et de l'Environnement de Strasbourg
 Ecole nationale supérieure d'ingénieurs de Caen
 Ecole nationale supérieure de chimie de Montpellier
 Ecole nationale supérieure de l'électronique et de ses applications
 Ecole Nationale Supérieure de Mécanique et d'Aérotechnique
 Ecole Nationale Supérieure de Mécanique et des Microtechniques
 Ecole nationale supérieure de techniques avancées
 Ecole nationale supérieure de techniques avancées - Bretagne (ex ENSIETA)
 Ecole nationale supérieure des arts et industries textiles
 Ecole nationale supérieure des Mines de Paris (Mines ParisTech)
 Ecole nationale supérieure des sciences de l'information et des bibliothèques
 Ecole nationale vétérinaire d'Alfort
 Ecole navale – Groupe des écoles du Poulmic
 Ecole normale supérieure de Lyon
 Ecole normale supérieure de Paris
 École normale supérieure Paris-Saclay
 Ecole polytechnique
 École Supérieure d'Ingénieur d'Agro-Développement International (ISTOM)
 Ecole supérieure de chimie physique électronique de Lyon
 Ecole Supérieure de Commerce de Paris
 Ecole supérieure de physique et de chimie industrielles
 École supérieure des sciences commerciales d'Angers
 Ecole supérieure des sciences économiques et commerciales
 Ecole Supérieure des Technologies Industrielles Avancées (ESTIA)
 EM LYON Business School
 ESCEM - Ecole de management
 ESIEE Paris
 Grenoble Ecole de Management
 Groupe des Ecoles Nationales d'Economie et Statistique
 Groupe ESA - École supérieure d'agricultures d'Angers
 Groupe ESC Troyes
 IMT Atlantique Bretagne - Pays de Loire
 INSEAD
 Institut agronomique méditerranée de Montpellier
 Institut catholique d'arts et métiers de Nantes
 Institut catholique d'arts et métiers de Toulouse
 Institut National des Sciences Appliquées Centre Val de Loire
  Institut Mines-Télécom Business School
 Institut National des Sciences Appliquées de Lyon
 Institut National des Sciences Appliquées de Rennes
 Institut National des Sciences Appliquées de Rouen
 Institut National des Sciences Appliquées de Strasbourg
 Institut National des Sciences Appliquées de Toulouse
 Institut national du service public
 Institut Polytechnique LaSalle Beauvais
 Institut supérieur d'agriculture Rhône-Alpes
 Institut Supérieur de Commerce
 Institut Supérieur de l'Aéronautique et de l'Espace (ex Supaero)
 Institut Supérieur international du parfum, de la cosmétique et de l'aromatique alimentaire
 Kedge Business School
 Montpellier SupAgro
 Neoma Business School
 Novancia Business School Paris
 ONIRIS - Ecole Nationale Vétérinaire, Agroalimentaire et de l'Alimentation Nantes Atlantique
 SIGMA Clermont
 SKEMA Business school
 Sup'Biotech
 Télécom ParisTech
 Télécom SudParis 
 Toulouse Business School
 VetAgro Sup

Libraries 
 Bibliothèque nationale de France
 Bibliothèque nationale et universitaire de Strasbourg
 Bibliothèque universitaire des langues et civilisations

Other 
 American University of Paris
 
 Assistance publique - Hôpitaux de Paris
 
 
 Centre hospitalier de Cayenne Andrée Rosemon
 Centre hospitalier de Gonesse
 
 
 Centre hospitalier régional de Metz Thionville
 
 
 Centre Hospitalier Universitaire de Bordeaux
 
 Centre hospitalier universitaire de Nîmes
 Centre hospitalier universitaire de Pointe-à-Pitre Abymes
 Centre scientifique et technique du bâtiment
 Cité internationale universitaire de Paris
 Collège de France
 Direction de l'enseignement militaire supérieur - Centre de documentation de l'Ecole militaire
 
 Groupement hospitalier de territoire Nord-Ouest Vexin Val d'Oise
 Hospices civils de Lyon
 Institut National de Recherche en Archéologie Préventive
 Institut National de Veille Sanitaire
 Institut National du Sport, de l'Expertise et de la Performance
 ISTP France
 Musée du Quai Branly
 Unicancer
 Université catholique de Lille

See also
 Open access in France

References

This article incorporates information from the French Wikipedia.

Further reading

External links 
 Official site

University associations and consortia in France
Grandes écoles
Grands établissements
1999 in education
1999 establishments in France
Organizations established in 1999